The 2011–12 Utah Utes men's basketball team represents the University of Utah. They play their home games at the Jon M. Huntsman Center in Salt Lake City, Utah, and are a member of the Pac-12 Conference. They are led by their first-year head coach Larry Krystkowiak. They finished with a record of 6-25 overall, 3-15 in Pac-12 play and lost in the first round of the 2012 Pac-12 Conference men's basketball tournament by Colorado.

Roster

Schedule and results 

|-
!colspan=9 | Exhibition

|-
!colspan=9 | Regular Season

|-
!colspan=9| 2012 Pac-12 Conference men's basketball tournament

Player Dismissal
On January 18, 2012 Josh Watkins was dismissed for his second violation of team rules within the same season. The first offense on December 6, 2011 led to Watkins being suspended for one game. Coach Krystkowiak would state that the program must always come first and that the integrity of the program cannot be sacrificed for one player.

References 

Utah
Utah Utes men's basketball seasons
Utah Utes
Utah Utes